The 2000 Hofstra Pride football team represented Hofstra University during the 2000 NCAA Division I-AA football season. It was the program's 60th season, and they competed as an Independent. The Pride earned a berth into the 16-team Division I-AA playoffs, but lost in the quarterfinals to eventual national champion Georgia Southern, 48–20. They finished #7 in the final national poll and were led by 11th-year head coach Joe Gardi.

The 2000 season was the first in which Hofstra went by the nickname "Pride." The previous spring, the school decided to change the nickname for their sports teams from Flying Dutchmen and Flying Dutchwomen to go into effect the 2000–01 school year.

Schedule

Awards and honors
First Team All-America – Doug Shanahan (The Sports Network, The Football Gazette); Khary Williams (AFCA)
Second Team All-America – Khary Williams (Associated Press)
Third Team All-America – Charlie Adams (Associated Press); Doug Shanahan (Associated Press); Khary Williams (The Sports Network); Dan Zorger (Associated Press, The Sports Network)
Honorable Mention All-America – Charlie Adams (The Football Gazette); Khary Williams (The Football Gazette)
First Team I-AA Independents – Charlie Adams, Rocky Butler, Trevor Dimmie, Rich Holzer, Doug Shanahan
Second Team I-AA Independents – Michael Curry, Ryan Fletcher, Jim Mayer, Robert Thomas, Joe Todd, Khary Williams, Dennis Winters
ECAC Second Team – Rocky Butler, Doug Shanahan, Khary Williams
I-AA Independents Offensive Player of the Year – Rocky Butler

References

Hofstra
Hofstra Pride football seasons
Hofstra Pride football